Stunt riding may refer to:
Artistic cycling on bicycles
 Motorcycle stunt riding on motorized vehicles
 Trick riding on horses